= Pratomysia =

Roman town of ancient Bithynia

Coordinates: 40°36′40″N 29°20′38″E

Pratomysia was a Roman town of ancient Bithynia. Its name does not occur in ancient authors but is inferred from epigraphic and other evidence.

Its site is located near Gacık, Asiatic Turkey.
